Joe Simons (born 15 July 1947) is a former ice hockey player.

Simons is the all-time leader point getter for the TYSC Trappers ice hockey club. He played with the club from the 1964 through to the 1974–75 season. He then played for the 1979/1980 season. He was team captain. Joe played 441 games and had 743 goals-405 assists with a total of 1148 points He also had 763 penalty minutes. Joe also played on the Dutch National Team. He played more than 70 games for the Netherlands.

Sources
eurohockey.net profile
TYSC Trappers Historic Site

Eredivisie (ice hockey) players
TYSC Trappers players
1947 births
Living people
Place of birth missing (living people)
Dutch ice hockey forwards